The 1861 Wheeling Convention was an assembly of Virginia Southern Unionist delegates from the northwestern counties of Virginia, aimed at repealing the Ordinance of Secession, which had been approved by referendum, subject to a vote.
 
The first of its two meetings was held before the vote, and some were keen to preempt ratification. But most preferred to elect delegates for a second meeting, should the vote go against them. When it did, the assembly formed its own Restored Government of Virginia, recognized by the Federal government, and empowered to authorize the creation of a new state of West Virginia.

First Wheeling Convention

The First Wheeling Convention was held on May 13 through May 15, 1861. 27 northwestern Virginia counties were represented. Of the 429 delegates who attended, over one-third were from the area around Wheeling. Most had been chosen at public meetings, while others attended on their own initiative. William B. Zinn, who had represented Preston County many times in the Virginia General Assembly, was elected chairman. Immediately, a debate ensued over which delegates should be allowed to participate in the Convention: Gen. John Jay Jackson of Wood County suggested seating all northwestern Virginians, but John S. Carlile insisted that only those who had been legitimately appointed by their constituencies be allowed to participate. Chester D. Hubbard of Ohio County ended the debate by proposing the creation of a committee on representation and permanent organization. 

Some, including Jackson, argued that preemptive action against the Ordinance of Secession before it was ratified was unwise. The Ordinance of Secession would not be presented to the citizens of Virginia for a vote until May 23. Others, including Carlile, insisted on immediate action to "show our loyalty to Virginia and the Union," and on May 14, he called for a resolution creating a state of New Virginia. Waitman T. Willey responded to Carlile's plan by saying that it was "triple treason"—treason against the state of Virginia, the United States, and the Confederacy. Carlile's motion was condemned as revolutionary, and most at the convention instead supported resolutions offered by the Committee on State and Federal Resolutions, which recommended that western Virginians elect delegates to a Second Wheeling Convention to begin on June 11 if the people of Virginia approved the Ordinance of Secession.

Second Wheeling Convention

Background and composition
A Second Wheeling Convention included 32 western counties, Alexandria and Fairfax County. Twenty-nine of the convention delegates were members of the Virginia General Assembly as state delegates or state senators, such as John J. Davis of Harrison County and Lewis Ruffner of Kanawha County. 

Arthur I. Boreman was selected to serve as president, and he declared, "We are determined to live under a state government in the United States of America and under the Constitution of the United States."

Counties adhering to the Confederate cause either did not send representatives or were not entitled to seats. Among the more prominent not to send a delegate to the Wheeling Convention was Greenbrier County. Delegate Mason Mathews from Greenbrier County instead attended the Virginia General Assembly in Confederate Richmond.

Many of the delegates at the Convention believed that the differences between eastern and western Virginia were irreconcilable and supported some sort of separation. Where differences existed at the Convention, they primarily related to how this separation should occur. Dennis Dorsey of Monongalia County called for permanent and decisive separation from eastern Virginia. Carlile, however, though he had called for a similar plan during the First Convention, persuaded the delegates that constitutional restrictions made it necessary for the formation of a loyal government of Virginia, whose legislature could then give permission for the creation of a new state.

Meeting and debate

John S. Carlile, who had represented transmontane Harrison County as an Unconditional Unionist at the Richmond Secession Convention, was the floor leader at the Second Wheeling Convention who shepherded in the creation of the Restored Virginia Government. On June 14, he expanded on his view of state and federal relations: "the people of Virginia in establishing government for themselves deemed it best to create two agents. The Federal Government is one, and the State Government is the other..."  Referencing Article VI of the U.S. Constitution, Carlile observed, "Any act done or performed by the State agent in conflict with the powers conferred upon the Federal agent is to be null and void. Thus it will be seen that within the powers conferred the federal agent is supreme, independent of, and above the State agent. Hence the doctrine of Mr. [Henry] Clay when he said: 'I owe a supreme allegiance to the Federal Government, a subordinate one to my own State.' That very instrument provides for its own alteration, amendment or change. On the application of two-thirds of the principals creating it, amendments can be proposed to it and changes effected, which will become a part and parcel of the original act itself, when ratified by three-fourths of the principals through their legislatures or in their conventions assembled... But [the right of secession] was never intended..."

On June 17, Carlile attacked the rebellion as treason: "it is the result sir, of mature deliberation, concocted in treason, for the express purpose of breaking up constitutional liberty in this country... The plot was one that was conceived in perjury at Washington, and carried out by falsehood throughout the country, attended by coercion, intimidation, insult and a reign of terror, which was equally concerted throughout Virginia, as well as in the other Southern States." Carlile then recounted events at the Richmond Secession Convention in which he had been an Unconditional Unionist. "For several days before the Convention passed the Ordinance of Secession, it was absolutely besieged; members were threatened with being hung to the lamp posts; their lives were jeopardized; the mob was marching up and down the streets, and surrounding the Capitol, and everything was terror and dismay."
 
Carlile continued to impeach the legitimacy of Virginia's referendum on secession. "Immediately upon the passage of the Ordinance of Secession, in every county, as far as I can learn, a systematic reign of terror was inaugurated." Throughout the state, "irresponsible persons assembled, under the name of 'committees of safety', who [told Union men] that they must leave the State... All Union men were admonished that they would be prosecuted for treason." Carlile then described the days leading up to the referendum: " Before the day of election arrived we see the troops from South Carolina, Georgia and other Southern States, placed all over the eastern and southern parts of the States running up into the valley, and in some parts of Western Virginia. In those parts of the State freedom of election was completely suppressed, and men who dared to vote against secession done it at the hazard of their lives. Thus, sir, you see the concert by which secession has been inaugurated and carried out in Virginia; and we see that same spirit that reigned in it from the beginning... TREASON..."

Outcomes
On June 13, Carlile introduced to the convention "A Declaration of the People of Virginia."  The document declared that under the Virginia Declaration of Rights, any substantial change in the form of state government had to be approved by a referendum.  Therefore, since the Secession Convention had not been convened by a referendum, all of its acts--including the Ordinance of Secession--were illegal and void.  It also declared the existing government in Richmond void and called for the reorganization of the state government on the grounds that Virginia's secession had effectively vacated all state offices. On June 19, delegates approved this plan unanimously.

The next day, June 20, the convention selected new officers of the Virginia state government (usually called the Restored Government of Virginia to avoid confusion with the secessionist government). Francis Pierpont of Marion County was elected governor. On June 25, the convention adjourned until August 6.

Chart of delegates
The delegates to the Second Wheeling Convention of 1861 from counties in western and northern Virginia.

Archives
The proceedings of the First Wheeling Convention were recorded by Judge Gibson Lamb Cranmer of Ohio County, Charles B. Waggener of Mason County, and Marshall M. Dent of Monongalia County. Judge Cranmer was also the Secretary of the Second Wheeling Convention and custodian of the manuscript proceedings, journals, and other documents of the Convention. However, his records for the convention were lost during an 1884 flood of Wheeling Island. Copies of the records were sought in Alexandria and Richmond but none were found. Virgil A. Lewis, State Historian of West Virginia, reconstructed them from daily records printed in the Wheeling Daily Intelligencer by Granville D. Hall, and published them as How West Virginia Was Made in 1909 (Hall having published The Rending of Virginia from his editing of the records in 1902).

See also
East Tennessee Convention, a similar event by pro-Union East Tennessee representatives 
Alexander Scott Withers, delegate for Lewis County at the First Convention
Virginia Conventions

References

Bibliography

External links
 First Wheeling Convention information
 Second Wheeling Convention information
 Text of Carlile's "A Declaration of the People of Virginia"
 Text of Carlile's "An Ordinance for the Reorganization of the State Government"

Secession crisis of 1860–61
West Virginia in the American Civil War
Southern Unionists in the American Civil War
Wheeling, West Virginia
Political history of Virginia
1861 in Virginia
1861 conferences